Bloomington is a 2010 coming-of-age drama film about a former child actress (Sarah Stouffer) attending college in search of independence and who ends up becoming romantically involved with a professor, played by Allison McAtee. Their relationship thrives until an opportunity to return to acting forces them to make life-altering decisions.

Bloomington was written and directed by Fernanda Cardoso and filmed in Indianapolis, Indiana and Los Angeles, California. The film received mixed reviews.

Plot summary
Jackie Kirk, a former child actress, catches the eye of an infamous, predatory lesbian teacher, named Catherine Stark (McAtee), when Jackie attends college in Bloomington, Indiana. Jackie attempts to fit in with her fellow students, who are in awe of her acting background. After meeting at an on-campus mixer, Catherine and Jackie begin a secret and scandalous affair that draws Jackie away from the college social life. Catherine and Jackie grow closer as they help each other discover more about themselves, when suddenly Jackie gets the chance to return to acting. Catherine becomes uncomfortable with their situation, seeing how it could seemingly never work out, with Jackie having to constantly visit Catherine under the guise of her just being a "friend," as it would be hazardous for both of them if their romance ever got out.

Catherine attempts to distance herself from Jackie by trying to declare they were never in a formal relationship, and that Jackie is not worth it in Catherine's eyes, while Jackie claims Catherine is worth it. Jackie, at odds with her friends, gets into a fight with Sandy (Erika Heidewald), jealous that Jackie is competing for a scholarship she doesn't need and angry that Jackie's affair with a teacher means she gets preferential treatment. Jackie slaps Sandy, who punches her in the face. The next day Jackie shows up at Catherine's doorstep with a black eye. Catherine sees paparazzi taking pictures and quickly drags Jackie into the house. While Catherine is taking care of Jackie, she notices Catherine is wearing a dress. When questioned about it, she reveals she is attending a party, Jackie asks if she is going alone, Catherine says no but will not reveal her date, and will not let Jackie replace her date, claiming she would just be attention starved; Jackie offends Catherine by insulting her for not being financed by her own means.

Jackie stays on the couch at Catherine's house when Catherine returns from the party, acting passive-aggressive towards Jackie, she brings her date, a male closer to her age, into her room, causing Jackie to leave. Jackie goes to a party and hangs out with friends and flirts with a male friend, Zach (Ray Zupp). After leaving for L.A. to film the movie version of Jackie's old show, Catherine loses her job due to her relationship with Jackie being partially exposed.

Months later, Jackie and Catherine are shown sleeping together one last time. Saying their goodbyes as a formal end to their romance, Jackie leaves the next day for her new role back in California.

Cast 
 Allison McAtee as Catherine Stark
 Sarah Stouffer as Jacqueline "Jackie" Kirk
 Katherine Ann McGregor as Lillian
 Erika Heidewald as Sandy
 Ray Zupp as Zach

Reception 
Lesbian media site After Ellen called Bloomington a "sexy and offbeat" and "fantastic little drama." The review notes that "Compared to other teacher-student romances that we’ve seen on the lesbian screen, including Mädchen in Uniform and the more recent Loving Annabelle, this is far more above-board," meaning that Jackie is a legal adult.

Queer website Autostraddle complains that by the end of the movie "nothing’s resolved and the Pandora’s box of issues that was opened in this relationship hasn’t been acknowledged by either party", adding that the action takes place "in a world where subtlety is not a concept that exists".

Legacy 
More than a decade after Bloomington'''s release, it is still finding new fans – and new critics – as people continue to discover the film via DVD or Amazon Prime. A fan-generated YouTube video that features a montage of clips of the most romantic scenes from the film, set to music, has been viewed 3.5 million times.

The fact that the film ends with the two principal characters going their separate ways has led some fans to hope for a Bloomington 2 – there is even a Facebook group called WE WANT Bloomington 2 and the call is repeated many times on social media. But, in truth, there is no indication that creator Fernanda Cardoso ever planned a follow-up film. In a behind-the-scenes feature on the DVD, Cardoso says that she’s working on the script for a horror film.

In a 2018 interview, McAtee, who has been in more than a dozen films since Bloomington,  said that Bloomington is still the film that she gets most feedback on, and that it seems to resonate with a lot of people.

In June 2021, Bloomington co-stars McAtee and Stouffer were reunited on screen when McAtee guest starred in two episodes of Stouffer's web series Grey Area. Their shared scenes made tongue-in-cheek references to Bloomington.

Awards
 Best Women's Feature—North Carolina Gay & Lesbian Film Festival
 Director's Spotlight—Vancouver Queer Film Festival
 Best Director—Indianapolis LGBT Film Festival
 Opening Night Feature—Barcelona Gay & Lesbian Film Festival
 Centerpiece Gala Selection—Reelout Queer Film + Video Festival

 See also 
 Loving Annabelle'' (2006)
 List of LGBT films directed by women

References

External links
 
 
 
 Bloomington YouTube Channel

2010 films
2010 LGBT-related films
2010 romantic drama films
2010s coming-of-age drama films
American coming-of-age drama films
American independent films
2010 independent films
American LGBT-related films
Films about scandalous teacher–student relationships
Lesbian-related films
LGBT-related coming-of-age films
LGBT-related drama films
LGBT-related romantic drama films
2010s English-language films
2010s American films